Westlund is a Swedish surname that may refer to:

Alex Westlund (born 1975), American ice hockey goaltender 
Åsa Westlund (born 1976), Swedish politician 
Ben Westlund (1949–2010), American politician 
David Westlund (born 1995), Swedish ice hockey defenceman
Simon Westlund (born 1994), Swedish speedcuber
Sven-Olof Westlund (born 1932), Swedish sprinter
Tommy Westlund (born 1974), Swedish ice hockey right winger 
Warren Westlund (1926–1992), American rower 
Wilhelm Westlund (born 1995), Swedish ice hockey defenceman

See also
Westlund Place, California, a locality in the United States 

Swedish-language surnames